The men's kumite 75 kilograms competition at the 2002 Asian Games in Busan was held on 11 October at the Yangsan College Gymnasium.

Schedule
All times are Korea Standard Time (UTC+09:00)

Results
Legend
DQ — Won by disqualification

Main bracket

Repechage

References
2002 Asian Games Report, Page 480

External links
Official website

Men's kumite 75 kg